Backtracks is a compilation album by the American country rock band  Poco, released in 1982.  The nine tracks are taken from the first six studio albums the band recorded for MCA after having left their original label Epic.

Track listing
"Heart Of The Night" (Cotton) – 4:49
"Keep On Tryin’" (Timothy B. Schmit) – 2:54
"Midnight Rain" (Cotton) – 4:25
"Widowmaker" (Young) – 4:25
"Crazy Love" (Young) – 2:55
"Legend" (Young) – 4:16
"Indian Summer" (Paul Cotton) – 4:40
"Under The Gun" (Cotton) – 3:11
"Rose Of Cimarron" (Rusty Young) – 6:42

Personnel
Rusty Young – steel guitar, banjo, dobro, guitar, piano
George Grantham - drums, vocals
Timothy B. Schmit – bass, vocals
Paul Cotton – guitar, vocals
Charlie Harrison – bass, vocals
Steve Chapman – drums
Kim Bullard – keyboards, vocals

Poco compilation albums
1982 compilation albums
MCA Records compilation albums